Sheila Lirio Marcelo is a Filipino-American entrepreneur. She is the co-founder and CEO of Proof of Learn, a Web3 education platform. Prior to Proof of Learn, she founded Care.com, an online marketplace for childcare, senior care, special needs care, tutoring, pet care, and housekeeping, where she served as CEO and chairwoman.

Biography 

Marcelo was born and raised in the Philippines, growing up in an entrepreneurial household that was involved in a number of businesses from coconut mills to mango and banana plantations to transportation and coal production. Part of her early childhood was spent in Houston with her five siblings. When Marcelo was 11, she attended Brent International School in Baguio.

She graduated magna cum laude from Mt. Holyoke College with a degree in economics and received M.B.A. and J.D. degrees, with honors and the Dean's Award from Harvard University. It was during her undergraduate years at Mt. Holyoke that Marcelo had her first child, Ryan;
her second son, Adam, was born right after graduating from Harvard Business School. While attending Harvard she also spent 30 hours a week on community activities, worked on several campus businesses and provided consulting services for the design of Harvard's Spangler Center.

Prior to founding Care.com, she served as a consultant at Monitor Company, Pyramid Research and Putnam, Hayes & Bartlett, a teaching fellow at Harvard Business School, Vice President of Product Management and Marketing at Upromise, an online service helping families save money for college, Vice President and General Manager of TheLadders.com, an online service helping people find jobs and entrepreneur-in-resident in the Boston office of Matrix Partners.

She currently lives in Weston, Massachusetts with her husband and two sons.

Care.com 

Marcelo's initial care challenge came after she had her first child, Ryan. She was a college student and immigrant, and didn't have family nearby as a support system. While helping care for her second baby boy, her father suffered a heart attack and she struggled to find care for him, as well as child care for her two sons.

Between October 2006 and the end of 2012, Care.com received $111 million in funding from investors including Matrix Partners, Trinity Ventures, New Enterprise Associates, USAA, and Institutional Venture Partners (IVP). Immediately prior to founding Care.com Marcelo was an Entrepreneur in residence at Matrix Partners, where she met with the founders of Sittercity.com and another website for finding caregivers, to discuss a potential investment and bringing Marcelo in as CEO. Matrix Partners did not invest in either firm and, months later, Marcelo founded Care.com and received $3.5 million in Series A funding from Matrix Partners, with Reid Hoffman, co-founder of LinkedIn also participating in that round. The Boston Globe reported on several allegations that Marcelo had met with other companies in order to use the information for starting Care.com. A spokesperson for Matrix responded denied any claims of "unfair treatment".

The company went public January 24, 2014. From its founding in 2006 through August 2012, Care.com had raised more than $111 million in venture capital from investors, including LinkedIn founder Reid Hoffman. In August 2019, Care.com announced that Marcelo would transition from CEO to executive chairwoman. In December 2019, Care.com was acquired by IAC for $500 million and is no longer publicly traded.

Proof of Learn 
Marcelo announced her involvement with Proof of Learn (POL) in January 2022. The Web3 "learn-to-earn" platform facilitates skill advancement in the metaverse by rewarding users with cryptocurrency and collectible NFT credentials. POL raised $15 million in a funding round led by New Enterprise Associates.

Awards and honors
Marcelo was named one of the top 40 entrepreneurs under 40 years of age by the Boston Business Journal (2009), one of the 10 most powerful women entrepreneurs by Fortune Magazine (2009), one of the 10 most powerful women in Boston Tech by The Boston Globe, to The Aspen Institute’s 2012 Class of Henry Crown Fellows, a "Tech Luminary Innovation All-Star" by the Boston Business Journal (2012), and one of The Boston Globe's 100 Innovators of 2013.  In 2010, she received the Ernst & Young Entrepreneur of the Year Award. In 2011, Marcelo was awarded a Marshall Memorial Fellowship and named as a Young Global Leader by the World Economic Forum. In 2013, she was inducted into the Academy of Women Achievers by the YMCA.)  In 2014, Marcelo received the prestigious Harvard Business School alumni award, "for her achievements as founder, chairwoman and CEO of Care.com". She is the second Filipino alum, after Jaime Zobel De Ayala, to be honored with this award.  Also in 2014, she was bestowed one of the highest honors for Filipinos, the Filipino Heritage Award or Pamana ng Pilipino from President Benigno Aquino III of the Philippines for her "excellence and distinction in the pursuit of [her] work or profession."  In April 2015, Marcelo received an honorary doctorate in humane letters from Mt. Holyoke College.

References 

1970 births
21st-century American businesspeople
Harvard Business School alumni
Living people
Mount Holyoke College alumni